Crossocheilus latius, also known as the smallmouth fringe barb, is a species of ray-finned fish in the genus Crossocheilus. It is endemic to the Kapuas basin, West Kalimantan on Borneo.

References

Crossocheilus
Fish described in 2017